The American Premier Soccer League (APSL) was a soccer league sanctioned by the United States Adult Soccer Association (USASA) with teams primarily in Southern Florida.

Competition format
The official regular season ran from January through September. For the playoffs, the four top seeded teams faced each other in semifinal games with championship being decided between the two winners. The APSL also organized a Fall Season that ran from September to December.

Organization
The APSL was organized in a mostly decentralized structure and was managed as a team-run league. Each year the member clubs helped elect a Commissioner, Treasurer and Secretary. Each team was individually owned and operated, and was responsible for maintaining league minimum standards. New teams seeking membership into the league were subject to approval from an executive committee of existing team owners. Member clubs had the right to make localized decisions for their respective markets, conferences and regions based on what they believed was best for their particular region.

Teams

Former teams 
 Alianza Miami FC
 Elite Soccer Academy
 Estudiantes del Guayas
Hurricanes FC
Miami Dade FC
 Miami Fusion FC
 Miami Nacional SC
Miami Storm FC
Miami United
 Palm Beach Piranhas FC
 Real Miami FC

Champions

Executive Board of Directors

See also
North American Soccer League
United Soccer League
USL Premier Development League
National Premier Soccer League
United Premier Soccer League

References

External links
APSL website

 
4
Sports leagues established in 2015
Sports leagues disestablished in 2019
2019 disestablishments in the United States
Defunct soccer leagues in the United States
Former summer association football leagues